Memphite dynasty may refer to:

In the Old Kingdom of Egypt
Third Dynasty of Egypt (2686 – 2613 BC)
Fourth Dynasty of Egypt (2613 – 2498 BC)
Fifth Dynasty of Egypt (2498 – 2345 BC)
Sixth Dynasty of Egypt (2345 – 2181 BC)
In the First Intermediate Period of Egypt
Seventh Dynasty of Egypt (2181 – 2160 BC)
Eighth Dynasty of Egypt (2181 – 2160 BC)